Garuda Saukiyama is a 1982 Indian Tamil-language crime film, directed by K. S. Prakash Rao and produced by T. S. Sethuraman. The film stars Sivaji Ganesan, Sujatha, Mohan and Thiagarajan. It revolves around a petty criminal who eventually rises to become a feared don. The film was released on 25 February 1982, and became a box-office bomb.

Plot 
Deenadayalan is an orphan raised by Mary. He starts with petty crimes and moves on to larger crimes as he grows older. He eventually becomes a don and masquerades as a charitable businessman to the world.

He takes Muthukrishnan under his wing. Despite this, Deenadayalan has a strong sense of justice and is seen as a protector of the poor and underprivileged. His wife Lakshmi and daughter Radha are completely unaware of his illegal activities. But, as he faces betrayal from those close to him, his work begins to impact his family.

Cast 
Sivaji Ganesan as Deenadayalan
Sujatha as Lakshmi
Thiagarajan as Muthukrishnan
Pandari Bai as Mary
Ambika as Radha
Mohan as Mohan
Rajyalakshmi as Meena
Sangili Murugan as Sathyanathan

Soundtrack 
The soundtrack was composed by M. S. Viswanathan.

Release and reception 
Garuda Saukiyama was released on 25 February 1982. Kalki negatively reviewed the film, criticising its similarities to The Godfather (1972). The film became a box-office bomb.

References

External links 
 

1980s Tamil-language films
1982 crime films
1982 films
Films directed by K. S. Prakash Rao
Films scored by M. S. Viswanathan
Indian crime films